The 1993–94 Kentucky Wildcats men's basketball team represented University of Kentucky. The head coach was Rick Pitino. The team was a member of the Southeastern Conference and played their home games at Rupp Arena.

Roster

NCAA tournament
Seeding in brackets
Southeast
 Kentucky (3) 83, Tennessee State (14) 70
Marquette (6) 75, Kentucky 63

Awards and honors
Travis Ford, Second Team, 1994-1995 All-SEC (AP and Coaches)
Tony Delk, Second Team, 1994-1995 All-SEC (Coaches, Third Team AP)
Rodrick Rhodes, Third Team, 1994-1995 All-SEC (AP and Coaches)

Team players drafted into the NBA

References

Kentucky Wildcats
Kentucky Wildcats men's basketball seasons
Wild
Wild
Kentucky